Osmaniye is a city on the eastern edge of the Çukurova plain in southern Turkey and the capital of Osmaniye province.

Backed by the foothills of the Nur Mountains, Osmaniye lay on one of the old Silk Roads and was always a place of strategic importance since it straddled the main route between Anatolia and the Middle East.

Osmaniye lies at the centre of a rich agricultural region watered by the Ceyhan river and known for growing peanuts. During the intensely hot summers many residents escape either to the Mediterranean coast or into the Nur mountains. The yayla of Zorkun is a particularly popular mountain retreat.

Osmaniye is strongly associated with Devlet Bahçeli, the leader of the MHP, who was its member of parliament for many years.

History 
Although Osmaniye was probably inhabited in turn by the Hittites, Persians, Byzantines and Armenians, there is nothing left to show their presence in the modern city.

An Islamic presence was first established by the Abbasid Caliph Harun al-Rashid, auxiliaries in his army being the first Turks to fight in Anatolia. They obviously liked the area and following the Turkish victory over the Byzantines at Malazgirt in 1071 waves of Turkish conquest began. The Nur Mountains were settled by the Ulaşlı tribe of the Turkmens.

The Ulaşlı remained the dominant local power into the period of the Ottoman Empire and were even involved in the Celali uprisings, during a period of crisis for the Ottomans in the 17th century. Eventually, in 1865 the Ottoman general Derviş Paşa was charged with bringing law and order to the Çukurova. He established his headquarters in the Osmaniye villages of Dereobası, Fakıuşağı and Akyar and brought the Ulaşlı down from the mountains to the village of Hacıosmanlı. This eventually became the province of Osmaniye. 

Between 1924 and 1933 the city of Osmaniye was the capital of the province of the same name. However, in 1933 the province was abolished and Osmaniye became the district governorate for Adana province. Then in 1996 Osmaniye was reinstated as Turkey's 80th province with the city of Osmaniye as its capital. Since then it has received more investment for infrastructure and now feels more like a city than the market town of old.

Local attractions 
Osmaniye town has few attractions for visitors other than the city-centre Kent Müzesi (City Museum). However, it makes a good base for visiting the scant remains of the nearby Roman city of Hierapolis-Castabala  which huddles at the base of a craggy rock with a castle, probably built by the Armenians, perched on top of it.

Climate

Osmaniye has a Mediterranean climate (Köppen: Csa, Trewartha: Cs) with very hot, dry summers and mild, wet winters.

References

External links

  Osmaniye governor's official website
  Osmaniye municipality's official website
  Osmaniye weather forecast information
  Osmaniye fm radio website

 
Çukurova
Cities in Turkey
Populated places in Osmaniye Province
Districts of Osmaniye Province